There were 179 Empire ships which had a suffix beginning with C. These are dealt with in two lists:-

 List of Empire ships - Ca to Cl
 List of Empire ships - Co to Cy

For other Empire ships, see:

Lists of Empire ships